The George Ormrod House is an historic home which is located in Tamaqua, Schuylkill County, Pennsylvania.

It was added to the National Register of Historic Places in 1977.

History and architectural features
Built sometime around 1870, the George Ormrod House is a two-and-one-half-story, irregular frame dwelling, which was designed in the Late Victorian style. 

It features a three-story tower and twenty-seven different angles in the perimeter of the house, including a variety of octagonal and square projecting bays.

It was added to the National Register of Historic Places in 1977.

References

Houses on the National Register of Historic Places in Pennsylvania
Victorian architecture in Pennsylvania
Houses completed in 1870
Houses in Schuylkill County, Pennsylvania
National Register of Historic Places in Schuylkill County, Pennsylvania